The Billboard Hot 100 is a chart that ranks the best-performing singles of the United States. Published by Billboard magazine, the data are compiled by Nielsen SoundScan based collectively on each single's weekly physical sales and airplays.

Twelve singles topped the chart during the year. "On Bended Knee" by Boyz II Men began its peak at the top in 1994. The longest running number-one single of 1995 is "Fantasy" by Mariah Carey, which logged eight weeks atop the chart. The second longest-reigning number one single is a three-way tie between "Take a Bow" by Madonna, "This Is How We Do It" by Montell Jordan, and "Waterfalls" by TLC, with seven weeks each.

"One Sweet Day" by Mariah Carey and Boyz II Men held the record for the longest running song at number-one on the Billboard Hot 100 with 16 weeks. It also broke the 14-week record held by Whitney Houston's "I Will Always Love You" and Boyz II Men's "I'll Make Love to You". Five of those weeks were logged in 1995 and the other 11 weeks were logged in 1996. Michael Jackson's "You Are Not Alone" became the first single to debut at number-one on the Billboard Hot 100 and holds the Guinness World Record as the first song in the 37-year history of the Billboard Hot 100 to debut at number one. In addition, "Fantasy", "Exhale (Shoop Shoop)" by Whitney Houston, and "One Sweet Day" also debuted at number-one on the Billboard Hot 100.

That year, 5 acts earned their first number one song: TLC, Montell Jordan, Seal, Coolio, and L.V. Mariah Carey and TLC were the only acts to hit number one more than once, with two songs each.

Chart history

Number-one artists

See also
1995 in music
List of Billboard number-one singles

References

Additional sources
Fred Bronson's Billboard Book of Number 1 Hits, 5th Edition
Joel Whitburn's Top Pop Singles 1955-2008, 12 Edition
Joel Whitburn Presents the Billboard Hot 100 Charts: The Nineties
Additional information obtained can be verified within Billboard's online archive services and print editions of the magazine.

United States Hot 100
1995